Sky Tower Abu Dhabi is a 292-metre tall skyscraper with 74 floors in Abu Dhabi, United Arab Emirates. It is located on Al Reem Island and includes office and residential space. Construction was completed in 2010 when it was the city's largest building but has been overtaken by The Landmark since, see also Abu Dhabi skyscrapers. The tower is twinned with the neighboring Sun Tower and part of the Shams Abu Dhabi development project.

The building, designed by the US firm Architectonica, has 474 residential units. The Arabian Construction Company (ACC) was commissioned to build the tower.

The building won the GCC Residential Project of the Year award at the Construction Week Awards 2011.

See also
List of tallest buildings in Abu Dhabi
List of tallest buildings in the United Arab Emirates

References

External links
 
 

Residential skyscrapers in Abu Dhabi
2010 establishments in the United Arab Emirates
Residential buildings completed in 2010
Office buildings completed in 2010
Arquitectonica buildings